Warren Eugene Mitchell Sr. (April 1, 1933 – October 15, 2020) was an American college basketball coach who was the head coach for the William & Mary Tribe men's basketball team from 1966 to 1972. In Southern Conference play, he guided his teams to a cumulative 33–37 record. Overall, Mitchell finished 58–98 in his six seasons as coach.

Mitchell died of complications from dementia and COVID-19 on October 15, 2020, during the COVID-19 pandemic in Virginia.

References

1933 births
2020 deaths
American men's basketball coaches
American men's basketball players
Basketball coaches from Virginia
Basketball players from Virginia
Davidson Wildcats men's basketball coaches
Deaths from the COVID-19 pandemic in Virginia
Guards (basketball)
High school basketball coaches in the United States
Lynchburg Hornets men's basketball players
Sportspeople from Lynchburg, Virginia
Richmond Spiders men's basketball players
William & Mary Tribe men's basketball coaches